The modern Lydian mode is a seven-tone musical scale formed from a rising pattern of pitches comprising three whole tones, a semitone, two more whole tones, and a final semitone.

 
Because of the importance of the major scale in modern music, the Lydian mode is often described as the scale that begins on the fourth scale degree of the major scale, or alternatively, as the major scale with the fourth scale degree raised half a step. This sequence of pitches roughly describes the scale underlying the fifth of the eight Gregorian (church) modes, known as Mode V or the authentic mode on F, theoretically using B but in practice more commonly featuring B. The use of the B as opposed to B would have made such piece in the modern day F major scale.

Ancient Greek Lydian
The name Lydian refers to the ancient kingdom of Lydia in Anatolia. In Greek music theory, there was a Lydian scale or "octave species" extending from parhypate hypaton to trite diezeugmenon, equivalent in the diatonic genus to the modern Ionian mode (the major scale).

 
In the chromatic and enharmonic genera, the Lydian scale was equivalent to C D E F G A B C, and C C E F F A B C, respectively, where  signifies raising the pitch by approximately a quarter tone.

Medieval Lydian mode
In the Middle Ages and Renaissance, this mode was described in two ways. The first way is the diatonic octave species from F up to F an octave above, divided at C to produce two segments:

 
The second is as a mode with a final on F and an ambitus extending to F an octave higher and in which the note C was regarded as having an important melodic function. Many theorists of the period observed that B is used more typically than B in compositions in Lydian mode.

Modern Lydian mode
The Lydian scale can be described as a major scale with the fourth scale degree raised a semitone, making it an augmented fourth above the tonic, e.g., an F-major scale with a B rather than B. This mode's augmented fourth and the Locrian mode's diminished fifth are the only modes to have a tritone above the tonic.
 
In Lydian mode, the tonic, dominant, and supertonic triads are all major. The subdominant is diminished. The triads built on the remaining three scale degrees are minor.

Notable compositions in the Lydian mode

Classical (Ancient Greek)
The Paean and Prosodion to the God, familiarly known as the Second Delphic Hymn, composed in 128 BC by Athénaios Athenaíou is predominantly in the Lydian tonos, both diatonic and chromatic, with sections also in Hypolydian.

Medieval
The 12th-century "Hymn to St. Magnus" from the Orkney Islands, referencing Magnus Erlendsson, Earl of Orkney, is in Gregorian mode or church mode V (F white notes), extending from the E below to the octave above, with B's throughout, in two-part harmony of mostly parallel thirds. The Sanctus, Agnus Dei, and Ite, missa est of Guillaume de Machaut's Messe de Nostre Dame feature extensive use of F and B, as well as F and B.

Romantic
A rare, extended use of the Lydian mode in the Classical repertoire is Simon Sechter's 1822 Messe in der lydischen Tonart (Mass in the Lydian Mode). A more famous example from around the same time is the third movement of Ludwig van Beethoven's String Quartet No. 15 in A minor, Op. 132 (1825), titled by the composer "Heiliger Dankgesang eines Genesenen an die Gottheit, in der lydischen Tonart" ("Holy Song of Thanksgiving by a Convalescent to the Divinity, in the Lydian Mode"). The alternating passages in F use the Lydian scale with sharp fourth scale degree exclusively.

Charles-Valentin Alkan's Allegro barbaro (Étude Op. 35, No. 5, published in 1848) is written strictly in F Lydian, with no B's present at all.

Anton Bruckner employed the sharpened fourth of the Lydian scale in his motet Os justi (1879) more strictly than Renaissance composers ever did when writing in this mode.

Gabriel Faure's song Lydia from "2 Melodies" Op 4 ?1872. This ode to Lydia - by Parnassian poet Leconte de Lisle - starts, appropriately, in the Lydian mode and, in F, has a raised 4th (B natural) in the first line of the melody.

Modern
In the 20th century, composers began once again to exploit modal scales with some frequency. George Enescu, for example, includes Lydian-mode passages in the second and third movements of his 1906 Decet for Winds, Op. 14. An example from the middle of the century is the scherzo movement of Carlos Chávez's Symphony No. 3 (1951–54). The movement opens with a fugue subject, featuring extremely wide leaps, in C Lydian with following entries in F and G Lydian. Alexei Stanchinsky wrote a Prelude in Lydian mode earlier in the 20th century.

Jazz
In Lydian Chromatic Concept of Tonal Organization, George Russell developed a theory that became highly influential in the jazz world, inspiring the works of people such as Miles Davis, John Coltrane, Ornette Coleman, and Woody Shaw.

Popular

"Blue Jay Way" (1967) by The Beatles
"Peregrine" (1968) by Donovan
"Billy Goat Hill" (1961) by The Kingston Trio
"Waltz #1" from the 1998 album XO by Elliott Smith (D Lydian).
Passage beginning at the words "Much as I definitely enjoy solitude" in the song "Possibly Maybe" by Björk.
XTC's "Jason and the Argonauts" from their English Settlement album.
"Pretty Ballerina" (1966) by The Left Banke
"Mihalis" (1978) by David Gilmour
"Flying in a Blue Dream" (1989) by Joe Satriani

Folk

 Many Polish folksongs, including the mazurka, are in the Lydian mode; the first six notes of this mode were sometimes known as the "Polish mode".

See also
Lydian chord, a chord that is related to the Lydian scale
Lydian dominant scale
Kalyani (raga), the equivalent scale (melakarta) in Carnatic music

Notes

Sources

Further reading

 Beato, Rick. 2018. "What Makes This Song Great? Ep. 2: The Police". YouTube (26 January. Retrieved 28 March 2018).
 Benward, Bruce, and Marilyn Nadine Saker. 2009. Music in Theory and Practice, eighth edition, vol. 2. Boston: McGraw-Hill. .
 Chase, Wayne. 2006. How Music Really Works!: Musical and Lyrical Techniques of the Masters, second edition. Vancouver: Roedy Black Publishing Inc. ; .
 Jones, George Thaddeus. 1974. Music Theory: The Fundamental Concepts of Tonal Music Including Notation, Terminology, and Harmony. Barnes & Noble Outline Series 137. New York, Hagerstown, San Francisco, London: Barnes & Noble. .
 Miller, Scott. 2002. Mel Bay's Getting Into ... Jazz Fusion Guitar. Pacific, Missouri: Mel Bay Publications. .

External links
 The Lydian mode in all seven three note per string positions, with intervals mapped out for guitar.
 Lydian mode in six positions for guitar at GOSK.com
 Lydian Mode – Analysis
Lydian mode theory and improvisation application

Modes (music)